Lewes Brooks is a  biological Site of Special Scientific Interest south of Lewes in East Sussex. The Falmer-Glynde and the Ouse valleys meet in Lewes Brooks, and the Upper and Lower Rises are the remains of the chalk uplands eroded by the Ouse.

This site is on the flood plain of the River Ouse, and has fields separated by ditches. Variations in salinity from brackish to spring-fed, together with periodic clearing of ditches, produce a variety of habitats. The site is home to a diverse array of invertebrate fauna, especially water beetles. There are also rare snails, flies and moths.

References

Sites of Special Scientific Interest in East Sussex